Bruno Rodríguez may refer to:
Bruno Rodríguez Parrilla (born 1958), Cuban politician
Bruno Rodriguez (footballer) (born 1972), French footballer
Bruno Rodríguez (tennis) (born 1986), Mexican tennis player
Bruno Rodriguez (activist) Argentine climate activist

See also
Bruno Rodrigues (disambiguation)